Heaven on One's Head (released in the United States as Skies Above) is a 1965 French science fiction film directed by Yves Ciampi. It was entered into the 4th Moscow International Film Festival where it won a Golden Prize.

Cast
 André Smagghe as Gaillac
 Marcel Bozzuffi as Captain
 Henri Piégay as Majo
 Bernard Fresson as Laurent
 Jacques Monod as Commandant Ravesne
 Yves Brainville as Bricourt
 Guy Tréjan as Le ministre
 Jean Dasté as M. Bazin
 Beatrice Cenci as L'amie de Majo
 Yvonne Monlaur as Françoise
 Roger Van Mullem as L'amiral
 Wladimir Bellin as Le commandant du sous-marin
 Jacques Santi as Jolivet

References

External links
 

1965 films
1960s science fiction films
Science fiction war films
French aviation films
Seafaring films
French science fiction films
1960s French-language films
Films directed by Yves Ciampi
1960s French films